Phoque is the French word for pinniped. It may also refer to:

 Ile des Phoques, a rugged granite island, with an area of 8 ha in south-eastern Australia
 , the name of two French submarines